is a Japanese anime television series co-produced by TV Tokyo, Softstar and Nada Holdings, and animated by Studio Deen.
It is based on the Taiwanese role-playing video game Xuan-Yuan Sword: The Millennial Destiny. The series is being streamed by Crunchyroll among the world except for Asia. It aired between October 1 and December 24, 2018.

Characters

Main characters

Yin and her sister Ning grew up in a small village alongside their friend Zhao, however the Imperial army attacked and destroyed their village, leaving Yin and Ning as nomads. As they travel to different villages performing their swordplay for a source of revenue, Yin discovers a Tianshu scroll containing a powerful Mujia spirit, Yun and a sword, forcing her to submit to a path of fighting against Taibai Empire, becoming a member of Resistance group led by Xiang Chu.

Ning is Yin's younger sister who had feelings for Zhao, but were unrequited. When the Imperial army attacked their village, Ning lost her arms and became nomads with her sister. They both travel to different villages and perform swordplay as their only source of revenue. When Yin discovers a Tianshu scroll containing a Mujia spirit named Yun, Yun creates magnetic prosthetic arms for Ning. 

Zhao is the childhood friend of Yin and Ning from their village who had feelings for Yin, but was also unaware of Ning's feelings for him. When the Imperial army attacked their village, Zhao was captured and taken into slavery, while his childhood friends suspect that he is dead. In the years that pass, Zhao learns how to read and write while learning how to read Construct blueprints and is taken under the tutelage of Mo Heng, the Chief Engineer of the Taibai Empire. After Mo Heng defected to Resistance group led by Xiang Chu, Zhao is visited by the young Empress Long Cheng, who is unaware of her identity and reveals his past and desire to end the war. Later the imperials capture Zhao thinking that he helped Mo Heng escape. However the appearance of Long Cheng and the revelation of her identity to Zhao (and the audience) granted him immunity, as well as a noble title and position of Chief Engineer. 

Yun is a girl form Mujia android who can be transformed into a more powerful fox-shaped fighting robot "Yun-hu" (雲狐). Crafted by a girl named Che Yun (protagonist of the original video game) in about 400 years ago, and sealed into Tianshu scroll. Yun can only be summoned by someone who is reincarnation of Che Yun.

Taibai Empire

Cheng is a little girl and the current Empress of the Taibai Empire. After meeting Zhao for the first time and introducing herself as just a girl who wanted to know Zhao, she learns of his true ambitions and reveals her true identity to him, granting him immunity and a royal title. Throughout the series, she would sneak out of her own room to hang out with Zhao.

Resistance

References

External links
 

Anime television series based on video games
Crunchyroll anime
Studio Deen
TV Tokyo original programming